ময়না (Moyna) is the second studio album by Bangladeshi singer-songwriter Ayub Bachchu, released on 1 December 1988 by Sargam Records. Despite his lack of success with his debut album "রক্ত গোলাপ (Blood Rose)",  this album was both commercially successful and well received by fans. Bachchu got his breakthrough with this album, including hit songs like "ময়না (Moyna)", "শুভ্র ভোরে (Early in the Morning)".

After Bachchu's deal with Zahed Electronics expired, he was signed to Sargam Records in late–1987. The recording sessions started in January and ended in November 1988. It features Bachchu's first lyrics "ও বন্ধু তোমায় (Oh, My Friend)". Unlike his debut album, this album doesn't feature the Adhunik bangla music fusion, but features pop standard song, like the self titled track, Bangladeshi classical standard song, "ওরে কে বলেরে? (Who Said it?)", hard rock standard song, "অনেক রাত্রি (Late at Night)". The album has sold over 60,000 copies in Bangladesh.

Track listing

Personnel
 Ayub Bachchu – lead vocals, lead guitars and bass guitars
 Khayem Ahmed – bass guitars, percussion
 Manam Ahmed – keyboards
 Shawkat Ali Emon – keyboards
 Moksud Jamil Mintu – keyboards
 Ahsan Elahi (Fanty) – drums

Production
 Panna Azam – recorder
 Ishtiaque Babu – sound engineering
 Bogi Naqib – mixing

References

Ayub Bachchu albums
1988 albums